EuroBasket Women  2001 occurred in France from September 14 to September 23, 2001. The winners were the home team France, followed by Russia and Spain.

Venues
The tournament was held in three cities in France: Orléans, Le Mans and Gravelines. The arenas, in which the tournament was held, were: in Orléans, Palais des Sports; in Le Mans, Antarès; and in Gravelines, Gravelines Sportica.

Qualification

The qualification to the tournament was held in 1999 and 2000. Twenty teams were divided into five groups of four. The top two qualified to the tournament. The following teams qualified to the EuroBasket Women 2001:

In addition to the qualified teams, who went through the qualification process, the host nation France automatically qualified to the tournament. Also, Poland, the gold medalist of EuroBasket 1999 Women, qualified to the tournament automatically.

Squads

Preliminary round
Times given below are in Central European Summer Time (UTC+2).

Group A

Group B

Knockout stage

Championship bracket

5th place bracket

Final standings

External links
 FIBA official website
 Eurobasket official website

  
2001
2001–02 in European women's basketball
2001 in French women's sport
International women's basketball competitions hosted by France
September 2001 sports events in France